Fairmont Hot Springs is an unincorporated resort community located in south-eastern British Columbia, Canada commonly referred to as Fairmont. The community has a population of 476, but receives frequent tourists. The local resort is centered around a soak pool and swimming pool fed by natural mineral hot springs. The original springs building, surrounded by hot spring water seeping out of the ground, still stands.

The community contains three golf courses: Mountainside and Riverside are 18-hole courses, while Creekside is a family-oriented 9-hole par 3. In the winter, the area is also home to a small downhill ski area, with three lifts (one double chair and two surface lifts), 13 runs and a tube park, as well as numerous cross-country trails. Fairmont Hot Springs has a strip mall including a market, restaurants, and a gift shop. Fairmont Hot Springs is home to the Dutch Creek Hoodoos, which are sandstone cliffs (hoodoos) with hiking trails located next to Dutch Creek, a source of the Columbia River and formerly a salmon breeding stream. Fairmont provides the only road access to Columbia Lake Provincial Park, five kilometers south.

Fairmont Hot Springs Airport is located here.
 
On July 15, 2012, a mudslide occurred in Fairmont Hot Springs. A small creek that runs throughout the town formed a natural dam and backup water built up. Several homes were evacuated along with a golf course and many people were airlifted to safety.

On March 9, 2022 the CEO of Fairmont Hot Springs resort, Vivek Sharma, asked  women attending the BC Tourism and Hospitality Conference to stand in honour of International Women's Day, then after a round of applause told them to "go clean some rooms and do some dishes."  It was a week before he issued an unapologetic"apology" offering to learn how to make the industry a "safer place" for women.

To the north are Invermere, Athalmer, Wilmer, Radium, Edgewater, and Golden. To the south are Canal Flats, Scookumchuck, Kimberley, and Cranbrook.

Images

References

External links 

 
 Mudslide hits Fairmont Hot Springs, B.C., CBC News, July 15, 2012

Columbia Valley
Hot springs of British Columbia
British Columbia populated places on the Columbia River
Populated places in the Regional District of East Kootenay
Ski areas and resorts in British Columbia
Designated places in British Columbia